(plural) was an honorific used by the ancient Greeks to render the Roman imperial title of . It was revived as an honorific in the 11th-century Byzantine Empire, and came to form the basis of a new system of court titles.

History
The term appears in the Hellenistic East as an honorific for the Roman emperors from the 1st century onwards, being a translation of the Latin . For example, the Temple of the Sebastoi in Ephesus is dedicated to the Flavian dynasty. This association also was carried over to the naming of cities in honor of the Roman emperors, such as Sebaste, Sebasteia and Sebastopolis.

The epithet was revived in the mid-11th century—in the feminine form —by Emperor Constantine IX Monomachos for his mistress Maria Skleraina, to whom he accorded quasi-imperial honours. A number of individuals were qualified as  thereafter, such as Constantine Keroularios, or Isaac Komnenos and his brother, the future emperor Alexios I Komnenos.

Under the Komnenian emperors
This process profoundly transformed the very nature of Byzantine aristocracy, with the imposition of an entire class of imperial relatives and associates superimposed on the "traditional" administrative system and the higher officialdom that constituted the Senate. In the words of historian Paul Magdalino, this move further isolated the imperial family from the common people and made them "partners in, rather than executives of, imperial authority". In this context, the scholar L. Stiernon calculated that in the period from the late 11th to the end of the 12th century, 30% of all  belonged to the ruling Komnenos family, 20% to the closely allied Doukas clan, and another 40% to other families of the high aristocracy who intermarried with the Komnenoi, the remaining 10% encompassing both Byzantines as well as foreigners who either intermarried with the imperial family or received the title as an honorific distinction.

The latter were members of various aristocratic families tied to the emperor via marriage to his female relatives ( means 'son-in-law in Greek). It is notable that among Byzantine , their precedence was not determined by the offices they might bear, but by the degree of their kinship to the emperor.

Later usage

His court dress was a white  hat with embroideries, a long  of "commonly used silk", and a  hat covered in red velvet and topped by a small red tassel. He bore no staff of office.

References

Sources

Further reading
  

Byzantine imperial titles
Byzantine court titles
Augustus